Torn Between Two Lovers  is the debut album by Mary MacGregor. It was produced and partly written by Peter Yarrow, and released in 1976.

Release and promotion 
The album was released in 1976 and reached the number 17 position on the Billboard 200 chart. Three singles were released in promotion of the album, all reaching both the Country singles and Hot 100 pop charts. The title track was a number-one hit on the pop and adult contemporary charts.

Critical reception 
Reviewing in Christgau's Record Guide: Rock Albums of the Seventies (1981), Robert Christgau gave the record a "C" and said, "I consider it significant that Peter Yarrow's first commercial success of the decade is an Olivia Newton-John substitute, albeit one who's willing to admit she fucks around."

Track listing 
Side one

 "Mama" (Stephen Ferguson)
 "This Girl (Has Turned Into a Woman)" (Peter Yarrow, Mary MacGregor)
 "Good Together" (Gretta Larson)
 "It's Too Soon (To Let Our Love End)" (Jim Salestrom)
 "Why Did You Wait (To Tell Me)" (Peter Yarrow)

Side two

 "The Lady I Am" (Gretta Larson)
 "For a While" (Peter Yarrow, Kevin Hunter)
 "I Just Want to Love You" (Randy Sharp)
 "Take Your Love Away" (Randy Sharp)
 "Torn Between Two Lovers" (Phil Jarrell, Peter Yarrow)

Personnel 
Tim Henson - keyboards
David Hood - bass guitar
Roger Hawkins - drums
Tom Roady - percussion
Pete Carr - lead guitar, acoustic guitar
Jimmy Johnson - rhythm guitar
Ken Bell - acoustic guitar
Larry Byrom - acoustic guitar on "Good Together"
Stu Basore - pedal steel guitar
Barry Beckett - keyboards, synthesizer
David Campbell - string arrangements and conducting
Muscle Shoals Horns (Charles Rose, Harrison Calloway, Harvey Thompson, Ronnie Eades)
Ginger Holladay, Lisa Silver, Sheri Kramer - background vocals

Charts

References

External links 
 

 

Mary MacGregor albums
1976 debut albums
Albums produced by Barry Beckett
Albums arranged by David Campbell (composer)
Albums recorded at Muscle Shoals Sound Studio
Ariola Records albums